Otkhara Castle is a castle in the village of Otkhara, Gudauta Municipality, Autonomous Republic of Abkhazia, Georgia. The castle was built in the Middle Ages. The castle walls are in a heavy physical condition and need an urgent conservation.

See also 
 Otkhara Cave Monastery Complex

References 

Castles and forts in Georgia (country)
Fortifications in Abkhazia